William Mentor Graham (1800 – 1886) was an American teacher best known for tutoring Abraham Lincoln and giving him his higher education during the future President's time in New Salem, Illinois. 
Graham was born near Greensburg, Kentucky. He died in 1886 in Blunt, South Dakota.

References

External links 
 
 
 Lincoln Lore
 Mentor Graham house
 

1800 births
1886 deaths
People from Green County, Kentucky
19th-century American educators
Abraham Lincoln
Educators from Kentucky